Chbar Mon is the capital of Kampong Speu Province in central Cambodia.

Most of the townspeople speak only Khmer, but some are conversant in Mandarin (They can usually be found employed by the small coffeeshops/restaurants or shops).

The center of the town hosts a market, surrounded by bicycle shops, a dispensary and small restaurants. There is a guesthouse (Pheng Ang Guesthouse) just minutes away for travelers.

Chbar Mon has numerous privately run schools and orphanages run by social and missionary organizations from Singapore, the Philippines and other countries.

References

External links

Provincial capitals in Cambodia
Cities in Cambodia
Populated places in Kampong Speu province